The Board for plant varieties is a Dutch public body, which is responsible for the grant and administration of the Dutch plant variety right.

References